The Opel Omega is an executive car engineered and manufactured by German automaker Opel between 1986 and 2004. The first generation, the Omega A (1986–1993), superseded the Opel Rekord. It was voted European Car of the Year for 1987, and was available as a saloon or estate. The second generation, the Omega B, was manufactured from 1993 to 2004.

Rebadged variants of the Omega were marketed worldwide, including in North America as the Cadillac Catera, in Great Britain as the Vauxhall Omega, and South America as the Chevrolet Omega. Re-engineered versions were manufactured in Australia since 1988 as the Holden Commodore (and its derivatives) since 1999, which were in turn exported to South America as the Chevrolet Omega and the Middle East as the Chevrolet Lumina.

Production of the Omega was discontinued in 2004, apart from the Australian re-engineered versions that carried on until 2006 as a sedan and 2007 in other guises. It was succeeded by the Opel Signum.



Omega A (1986–1994)

Development
The original Omega went into production in September 1986, as a replacement for the final version of the Opel Rekord, which had been in production since 1978. Sales began in November. The body was designed as an evolution of the previous Opel design theme engineered more towards aerodynamics in view of higher fuel prices and the general drive towards more fuel efficiency. The result was a remarkable drag coefficient of 0.28 (0.32 for the Caravan). The whole development program cost 2.5 billion Deutschmarks or £1.5 billion. The UK market version of the final generation of Rekord had been marketed as the Vauxhall Carlton, and this nameplate was retained for the new car.

Late in 1986, it was voted European Car of the Year for 1987, ahead of the highly acclaimed new versions of the Audi 80 and BMW 7 Series. Compared to the Rekord, the Omega featured many modern technological advances, which were new to Opel in general, if not to the volume segment European automotive market. These included electronic engine management, ABS, on-board computer (which displayed parameters such as momentary fuel consumption or average speed), air-conditioned glove compartment, and even the then fashionable LCD instrument cluster (available in CD version from 1987, but dropped in 1991). More importantly, the Omega came with a self-diagnosis system (which is now a standard feature in present-day cars), whose output could be read by appropriately equipped, authorised service stations.

Markets
The Omega was sold in most European countries, albeit with "Vauxhall Carlton" badging in the United Kingdom. In Japan, the Omega A (and Vectra) were the first Opels to be distributed by Isuzu Motors Ltd. rather than by long-standing importer Toho Motors (東邦モーターズ), beginning in July 1989. In the Isuzu lineup, it was slotted far above the Isuzu Aska and occupied the position once held by the Isuzu Statesman de Ville as Isuzu's large car.

Engines
All the Omega models used a longitudinally mounted engine with a rear-wheel drive setup, with a five-speed manual transmission or four-speed automatic transmission. The engine range consisted of 1.8 L, 2.0 L, and 2.4 L four-cylinder units (as well as 2.0 L, 2.3 L diesel, and 2.3 L turbodiesel) to 2.6 L, 3.0 L, and 3.0 L-24v six-cylinder units. The 1.8 L and 2.0 L four-cylinder petrol engines were all based on the Family II design, whilst the six-cylinder units and the 2.4 L four-cylinder were based on the older Opel cam-in-head engine family.

In Brazil, the car was sold as the Chevrolet Omega and powered by 2.0 L I4 (C20NE and C20YE) or 3.0 L I6 (C30NE) Opel engines until 1994. As fitted to the Omega, this engine was tuned by Lotus and equipped with multi port fuel injection. The Chevrolet Omega was produced until 1998.

Notable trim levels and special variants
The four basic trim levels were LS, GL, GLS, and CD (from least to most expensive). The base LS was clearly intended for the fleet market, with the sedan unavailable to individual customers in some markets. The LS Caravan was also available as a panel van with rear side windows covered, with body-coloured foil rather than replaced by solid panels.

For the 1991 model year, the Omega A was afforded a facelift, which encompassed slight alterations to front and rear fascias, as well as interior materials and additional sound dampening. The until then base 1.8 L engine was dropped. The LS and GLS trim levels were also dropped, while the CD was joined by Club and CD Diamant.

Omega Diamant
This options package was introduced in 1988, and could be added onto the GLS, LS, and CD trim versions. It included alloy wheels, metallic paint, tinted windows, stereo with cassette player, various leather trim in the interior, and a painted grille and door mirrors. It sold well and the package was kept after the facelift and a similar system with the same name was used for the Omega B.

Omega 3000

The Omega 3000 was the sports version of the Omega A model range. It featured a straight-six, 3.0 litre, 12-valve engine, which produced . Other modifications from the base model included a lowered suspension and limited-slip differential, as well as different fascias and a rear spoiler. The catalyzed version of the engine originally only had . The uncatalyzed model was discontinued in August 1988. In countries where the Omega 3000 was sold as a Vauxhall, it was called the Carlton GSi 3000.

In October 1989, the Omega 3000 received an optional new engine with 24 valves, two overhead camshafts, and a variable intake manifold (Opel Dual Ram system). It also used a more advanced engine control unit.

Omega Evolution 500

This was a limited series model produced together with Irmscher. It was built so Opel could compete in the DTM. The car had a three-litre straight-six engine producing .
It did not, however, achieve great success.

Lotus Omega

In 1989, Opel sanctioned a high-performance version of the Omega built in cooperation with Lotus. This version was named the Lotus Omega or Lotus Carlton depending on whether the base car was sold as an Opel Omega or Vauxhall Carlton in their respective European markets. The car was built using a variety of parts from other GM suppliers and manufacturers. The engine was based on Opel's standard 3.0-litre, 24-valve, which was handed to Lotus to modify.

As a result, engine capacity rose to 3.6 litres; in addition, two Garrett T25 turbochargers were installed along with a water-cooled intercooler. The engine management was also modified, and the ignition changed to an AC Delco type (same system as the Lotus Esprit uses).

This Omega also inherited a larger differential from Holden's Commodore with a 45% LSD, whereas the gearbox was a six-speed manual ZF gearbox fitted to the Corvette ZR1. The tyres were custom made by Goodyear, and can be recognised by the small Greek letter Ω (Omega) on the side. These were required, as this car could reach , which made this Omega the world's fastest production sedan at the time.

The  car accelerated from 0– in 5.3 seconds and 0– in 11.5 seconds.

Omega B (1994–2004)

The 1994 Omega B was an all new car with a modern exterior design, but a traditional rear-wheel drive chassis. The engine range was all new. Its MV6 model was rebadged and sold in the United States as Cadillac Catera between 1997 and 2001. The Omega B's platform was also modified to form the basis of the Australian third-generation Holden Commodore up to 2006, commencing with the 1997 VT series. This generation also succeeded the Opel Senator and Vauxhall Carlton as GM's executive car offering in European markets.

This was 1995 Semperit Irish Car of the Year in Ireland, and 1995 RJC Car of the Year for Import Car of the Year in Japan.

Leaked images of a design studio mockup, featuring Opel badges and "D" plates, emerged in Europe in February 1990. The media at the time described the new saloon as coupé-like, speculating a release in 1992 or 1993. Meanwhile, the Cadillac Aurora (which also served as the basis for the Oldsmobile Aurora) presented by General Motors at the 1990 Chicago Auto Show in February, was the concept car that bore close resemblance to the Omega B's eventual design style.

Facelift (B2; 1999–2004)
The Omega B2 was launched in autumn 1999 as a facelift of the B. It was distinguished by relatively minor revisions to the front and rear styling, centre console, and the introduction of an electronic stability program. Gradually, new engines or slightly larger displacement also replaced the earlier ones; the new ones were generally Euro 3 emissions compliant.

Major changes:
Hood (grill now integrated with hood)
Bumper fascias and bodyside mouldings
Taillights
Side mirrors
New design of alloy wheels
Brand new central console with GPS, air conditioning, and controls
Electronic stability program

Engines
The engines were not a major departure from the Omega A, aside from the shift from Opel's own (outdated) 2.3-liter diesel to BMW's M51 turbocharged inline-six. Originally with the model code U25DT, this was updated to the Euro 2 compliant X25DT engine during 1996.

In the end of 1999, the Omega received a facelift and a 2.2 L 16-valve engine was added to the range as an eventual replacement for the 2.0 L which was discontinued within a year.

The following year, a 3.2 L V6 engine replaced the 3.0 L V6 unit, and a 2.6 L V6 engine replaced the 2.5 L V6 unit. Year 2001 brought also brand new diesel 2.5 DTI engine from BMW, with a "common rail" fuel system.

Engines

Omega V8 (prototypes)

In an effort to better compete with the BMW 5 Series and the Mercedes-Benz E-Class, Opel decided to install a V8 engine into what was at the time their flagship model, the Opel Omega. Prototypes of sedan and station wagon versions were built (equipped with multimedia systems, and named V8.com).

Omega V8.com
The V8.com concept car project was meant to be a "mobile office" it was built on Omega station wagon, which was elongated by 130 mm, to provide more space for the passengers and additional equipment; it contained separate 9.5-inch LCD screens for all passengers, Internet access, and integrated video conference mobile phone system with separate cameras and microphones providing passengers hands-free operation – hence the name.

The car was also equipped with xenon headlights, and Advanced Frontlighting System, automatically adjustable to the road conditions. It was powered by a GM LS1 V8 engine.

The car debuted at Frankfurt Motor Show in September 1999.

Omega V8
Opel was planning to upgrade its flagship Omega model with a powerful GM LS1 V8 engine used in the Chevrolet Corvette. Unlike the V8.com which was a concept car, this model was intended to go into serial production. The Omega V8 was shown publicly for the first time at the 70th Geneva Motor Show (2–12 March 2000). The V8-engined version was to be put on sale autumn 2000, but it was cancelled after 32 pre-series cars had been completed.

The reasons for cancelling production plans were concerns regarding the transmission and about whether the engine was vollgasfest (German, "full throttle resistant"). The engine might overheat and be damaged if driven flat out on the Autobahn for long periods of time. While cooling was resolved by using the larger Holden Commodore radiator, the transmission problem remained. The Chevrolet Corvette (C5) had a transaxle transmission; the only gearbox suitable for the Omega V8 was the GM 4L60-E 4-speed automatic transmission. However, the transmission's flexplate repeatedly broke at  during the  vollgasfest test. The solution to this problem would take longer than the planned production of the Omega.

Holden did equip its Commodore (which was a re-engineered Omega for Australian market) with the same V8 engine. A version of this platform was used for the Holden Monaro, which was marketed in the United States as the fourth-generation Pontiac GTO, and in the United Kingdom as the Vauxhall Monaro.

Worldwide markets

In the United Kingdom, the Omega A was marketed as the second-generation Vauxhall Carlton (the first-generation Vauxhall Carlton having been a rebadged Opel Rekord) E2, and the Omega B generation as Vauxhall Omega. Between 2001 and 2007, Vauxhall sold the Australian-made Monaro coupe, which was derived from the Holden Commodore, itself based on the Omega B platform.
In Brazil, between 1991 and 1998, the Omega A was built and marketed as a Chevrolet Omega sedan or Omega Suprema in station wagon form. Between 1999 and 2006, this Chevrolet was the Omega B-derived Holden Commodore imported from Australia.
In North America, a badge-engineered version of the Omega B and Omega B FL was marketed as the Cadillac Catera. Between 2004 and 2006, Pontiac reintroduced and sold its GTO as a coupe based on the Australian-made Monaro, which was derived from the Holden Commodore.
In Australia, reengineered versions of the Opel Omega A were manufactured by Holden (a GM subsidiary) as the second generation Commodore and its derivates (including long wheelbase wagons, utility and luxury sedans, Statesman and Caprice) between 1988 and 1997. Between 1997 and 2006, Holden instead adapted the Omega B for its third generation as the Commodore and derivates, which now also included the Monaro coupe.

These Australian sedans are larger in all body dimensions and have featured less sophisticated suspension designs, different interior styling, and powertrains ranging from a Buick-derived 3.8-litre V6 between 1988 and 2004 or 5.0-litre V8 between 1988 and 1999, both manufactured by Holden, to a new 3.6-litre V6 from 2004 also built and exported by Holden and fully imported Chevrolet V8 engines, beginning with a 5.7 litre version in 1999, upgraded to a 260 kW 6.0 litre version in 2006. These vehicles were equally available in New Zealand.
 Since 1999, the Omega B based second generation Holden Commodore and its derivatives were exported to North America, Brazil, and the United Kingdom in sedan and coupe form as noted above, but also as a Chevrolet Lumina in the Middle East and South Africa. The Holden Commodore's 1999 long-wheelbase luxury derivative, WH-series Statesman/Caprice, was also exported to the Middle East as the fifth-generation Holden Caprice. In 2005, as the WK Statesman, this vehicle was sold in China as the Buick Royaum and in Korea as the Daewoo Statesman.
 The Omega was one of the first models introduced by Opel after their return to the Philippines in 1997. Shortly after the brand's discontinuation in the Philippine market, it was replaced by the Chevrolet Lumina, but instead of being based on the Holden Commodore like other markets, the Philippines received a rebadged Chinese-market Buick Regal sourced from Shanghai GM.

End of the Omega
In the United Kingdom, the Vauxhall Omega proved to be a successful saloon, despite being slated in many reviews for heavy depreciation and unreliability. Omegas and Carltons were a regular sight on United Kingdom roads, sporting police livery and as covert traffic surveillance cars.  However, just four years after the introduction of its latest incarnation, Omega B2, and seventeen years since introduction of Omega A, production of this model ended. On 25 June 2003, the last Omega rolled out of the factory in Rüsselsheim – it was a silver 3.2 L V6 Omega B2, number 797,011.

Following the demise of its direct rivals, the Ford Scorpio and Rover 800, the former due to its controversial styling, Opel/Vauxhall found themselves competing against BMW's 5 Series, with minimal sales success. Apart from the Australian re-engineered Holden Commodore models that carried on until 2006 for the sedan (wagons and utilities until 2007), production of the Omega ended in 2003. The position that the Omega held as Opel's flagship model (after the demise of the Senator) would be taken over by the smaller Opel Signum which used an extended-length platform of the Opel Vectra and incorporated practical features of both MPVs and station wagons into one package. Remaining stock of cars were still sold until 2004. In the Philippines, the Omega was replaced by the Chevrolet Lumina.

Stories and photographs of a "new" successor appeared in the motoring press one year later. In the case of Auto Express, though, its October 2004 article simply featured the Holden Torana TT36 concept car, which itself previewed the 2006 Holden Commodore. Nevertheless, Holden contributed in the Omega badge remaining alive by it, for the entry-level model of its new Commodore. Unlike prior models since 1978, this new Holden was no longer based on an Omega platform.

As of July 2020, only 3297 Vauxhall Omegas and 306 Carltons (including some rebadged Rekords) are left on the road in the United Kingdom.

References

Omega
Euro NCAP executive cars
Executive cars
Flagship vehicles
Rear-wheel-drive vehicles
Taxi vehicles
Police vehicles
Sports sedans
Station wagons
Cars introduced in 1986
1980s cars
1990s cars
2000s cars
Full-size vehicles
Cars discontinued in 2004